Pamela Harrison Turnure Timmins (born 1937) is the first Press Secretary hired to serve a First Lady of the United States. She was the Press Secretary to Jacqueline Kennedy. Turnure reportedly had an extramarital affair with 35th President of the United States John F. Kennedy.

Early life and education 
Born in New York City, Turnure attended Georgetown University.

Career 
Turnure worked for then-United States Senator John F. Kennedy as a receptionist and secretary in his Senate office from 1958 until his election in 1960. Turnure then was hired as the first Press Secretary to a First Lady in United States history, working under Jacqueline Kennedy.

In her role as press secretary, Turnure was frequently present at diplomatic receptions and to receive foreign dignitaries. Turnure also helped to coordinate Ms. Kennedy's nationally televised White House tour and historical preservation efforts.

Turnure was aboard Air Force One at Love Field Airport as Lyndon B. Johnson took the oath of office two hours and eight minutes after the assassination of John F. Kennedy in Dallas, Texas. Shortly after the assassination took place, Vice President Johnson kissed Turnure on the hand.

After the assassination events and funeral, Turnure left for New York and worked on President Kennedy's administrative papers, a project that was funded by Aristotle Onassis. Turnure also served for a period as the manager of Mrs. Kennedy Onassis' private office and was present at her funeral.

After working for the Kennedy family, Turnure was an interior designer in the Manhattan area.

Alleged affair with Kennedy 
In The Dark Side of Camelot published in 1997, author Seymour Hersh alleged that Kennedy had an extramarital affair with Turnure in 1958 when she was working in his Senate office. In 1958, Turnure's landlady Florence Kater allegedly took a photograph of the senator leaving Turnure's apartment building in the middle of the night, a photograph that Kater tried repeatedly to bring to public attention to ruin the senator's presidential campaign, according to Hersh. Kater and her husband allegedly rigged a tape recorder to pick up sounds of the couple's lovemaking and made an enlargement of their picture of Kennedy as he exited the building. The credibility of The Dark Side of Camelot was called into question immediately after its 1997 publication.

Personal life 
Turnure was the daughter of Louise Gwynn and Lawrence Turnure, a New York banker. Her stepfather was Frederic Drake, who was publisher of Harper's Bazaar and Vice President of Hearst Communications.

Turnure previously dated Prince Aly Khan. Turnure was married to New York investment banker Robert N. Timmins and resided in Manhattan. Jacqueline Kennedy attended the wedding and threw a private reception for the couple at her Fifth Avenue apartment.

Turnure now resides in Edwards, Colorado.

In popular culture 
In the 2016 film Jackie, Turnure was portrayed by Hélène Kuhn.

References 

Living people
1937 births
Kennedy administration personnel
American press secretaries
First Lady of the United States press secretaries
Mistresses of John F. Kennedy
New York (state) Democrats
Georgetown University alumni
People from New York City
People from Eagle County, Colorado